Johannes Rouning (or Ronning) was a United States Navy sailor and a recipient of the United States military's highest decoration, the Medal of Honor. He was likely born in Norway in May 1859.  

On that day, he and another sailor, Seaman Christian Osepins, jumped overboard and rescued Gunner's Mate James Walters from drowning. For this action, both Rouning and Osepins were awarded the Medal of Honor two and a half years later, on October 18, 1884.

Rouning's official Medal of Honor citation reads:
For jumping overboard from the U.S. Tug Fortune, 7 May 1882, at Hampton Roads, Va., and rescuing from drowning James Walters, gunner's mate.

See also

List of Medal of Honor recipients during peacetime

References

External links

Year of birth missing
Year of death missing
United States Navy sailors
United States Navy Medal of Honor recipients
Non-combat recipients of the Medal of Honor
Norwegian-born Medal of Honor recipients